Raúl García may refer to:

Politicians
Raúl Roa García (1907–1982), Cuban intellectual, politician and diplomat

Sportspeople

Association football
Raúl García (footballer, born 1959), Peru international left-back
Raúl García (footballer, born 1962) (1962–2018), El Salvador international goalkeeper
Raúl García (footballer, born 1976), Spanish defender
Raúl García (footballer, born 1980), Spanish centre-back
Raúl García (footballer, born 1986), Spain international midfielder
Raúl García (footballer, born 1989), Spanish left-back
Raúl García (footballer, born 2000), Spanish forward

Other sports
Raúl García (basketball) (1924–2013), Cuban Olympic basketball player
Raúl García (swimmer) (born 1930), Cuban Olympic swimmer
Raúl García (wrestler) (born 1943), Mexican Olympic wrestler
Raül García Paolicchi (born 1952), Andorran chess player
Raúl García (field hockey) (born 1959), Cuban Olympic hockey player
Raúl García Castán (born 1970), Spanish mountain runner and sky runner
Raúl García (boxer) (born 1982), Mexican professional boxer

Fictional people
Raul Garcia (The Messengers), fictional character